The 1977 Montana Grizzlies football team was an American football team that represented the University of Montana in the Big Sky Conference during the 1977 NCAA Division II football season. In their second year under head coach Gene Carlson, the team compiled a 4–6 record.

Schedule

Roster

References

Montana
Montana Grizzlies football seasons
Montana Grizzlies football